Segno is a village in North Western Italy in the region of Liguria. It belongs to the Municipality of Vado Ligure.

Its countryside landscape makes it a popular venue for outdoor sports including mountain biking, cross-country running, trail and cross-country motorbike, and hiking.

Events and Festivals 
 Escargots festival in the beginning of June
 Fish festival in mid-July
 Eggplant festival in early August.

Landmarks and architectural sites
San Maurizio Church
Santa Margherita Oratory
San Bernardo Church
Ruggiuetta Bridge
Castle
French Army Campsite

References 

Frazioni of the Province of Savona
Former municipalities of the Province of Savona